Tephritis oedipus is a species of tephritid or fruit flies in the genus Tephritis of the family Tephritidae.

Distribution
Kazakhstan, Central Asia, Mongolia, China.

References

Tephritinae
Insects described in 1927
Diptera of Asia